Guildford Exchange is a major public transit exchange serving Guildford Town Centre in Surrey, British Columbia, Canada. Opened on May 30, 1975, it is a connection point for routes serving the Whalley, Fleetwood, Guildford and Cloverdale areas of Surrey, as well as Langley Centre. A number of routes using the exchange serve the SkyTrain system via Surrey Central Station.

Structure and Location
The exchange is mainly located on 104 Avenue, in the mid-block between 150 and 152 Street, under the pedestrian overpass at Guildford Town Centre mall. Two more stops are located along 105th Avenue immediately north of the mall by Guildford Recreation Centre. There are designated bus standing and loading areas but no separation from regular traffic. Transfers between eastbound and westbound buses require passengers to travel on the pedestrian overpass, which is only open during the mall operating hours. Passengers with mobility issues and anyone travelling outside of the mall operating hours must cross the street at an intersection, which is approximately 5 minutes on foot.

Transit Connections

Bay assignments are as follows:

Notes

References

TransLink (British Columbia) bus stations
Transport in Surrey, British Columbia